"Deep Down" is a song written by Walt Aldridge and John Jarrard, and recorded by American country music artist Pam Tillis.  It was released in October 1995 as the first single from the album All of This Love.  The song reached #6 on the Billboard Hot Country Singles & Tracks chart.

Chart performance

Year-end charts

References

1996 singles
1995 songs
Pam Tillis songs
Songs written by Walt Aldridge
Songs written by John Jarrard
Arista Nashville singles